Can't Complain is a 2009 American film directed by Richard Johnson. The phrase may also refer to:
"Can't Complain", a song by Nickel Creek from the album Why Should the Fire Die?
"Can't Complain", a song by Relient K from the album Collapsible Lung